Littran is a village in Nakodar. Nakodar is a tehsil in the district Jalandhar of Indian state of Punjab.

Relation to other villages 

It is connected to Addhi Khuyi which lies in the south of Nakodar and Nurmahal. Littran is almost 425 kilometres from New Delhi and approximately 120 kilometres from Amritsar.

See also
 Harbans Singh Jandu or Jandu Littranwala, Indian musician

References

Villages in Jalandhar district
Villages in Nakodar tehsil